Sandy Pond Beach Unique Area is a  New York State conservation area located within the eastern Lake Ontario dunes. There is no road access to the area, which can be most easily reached by boat. For this reason, local residents have long referred to the beach as "Boaters' Beach". It has been managed as part of Sandy Island Beach State Park since 2011.

History
The area was purchased by The Nature Conservancy in 1994 from two private owners who were concerned about preservation of the land; the purchase price was about $300,000. The new conservation area was named the Sandy Pond Beach Natural Area. The purchase was followed by a restoration effort involving beachgrass plantings and construction of boardwalks to prevent damage to the beachgrass by foot traffic. The Nature Conservancy properties were purchased by New York State to create the Unique Area, which was managed by the New York State Department of Environmental Conservation as part of the New York State Forest system.

In 2011, administration and ownership of Sandy Pond Beach Unique Area was transferred to the New York State Office of Parks, Recreation and Historic Preservation to be incorporated into nearby Sandy Island Beach State Park.

Habitat and ecological value
There is a bird sanctuary on the northernmost tip of this area that hosts large numbers of shorebirds during migration; the Unique Area is part of the Eastern Lake Ontario Marshes Bird Conservation Area that also includes Deer Creek Marsh, Lakeview, and Black Pond Wildlife Management Areas. Visitors and pets are not allowed in the bird sanctuary.

The Unique Area was designated as part of the "Eastern Lake Ontario Barrier Beach and Wetland Complex" New York Natural Heritage Area in 2007.

References

External links

New York (state) unique areas
New York State Natural Heritage Areas
State parks of New York (state)
Protected areas of Oswego County, New York